Old Main is a historic building on the campus of Minot State University in Minot, North Dakota. It was designed by Fargo architects Haxby & Gillespie in 1912.

Old Main houses the College of Business, Division of Music, and the Social Science Department. Old Main was recently renovated. The building also houses the Ann Nicole Nelson Hall, an auditorium named in honor of Ann Nicole Nelson, a victim of the September 11, 2001 attacks.

References

External links
Minot State University website

Minot State University
Minot State University
Music venues in Minot, North Dakota
School buildings completed in 1912
1912 establishments in North Dakota